Geir Mork (born 29 August 1955) is a Norwegian literary researcher, businessperson and publisher. He was born in Ålesund. He was CEO of the publishing house Gyldendal Norsk Forlag from 1995 to 2015. He resides at Jar.

References

1955 births
Living people
People from Ålesund
Norwegian publishers (people)